Baloise-Trek Lions (UCI Code: TBL) is a UCI Continental cycling team based in Belgium which focuses predominantly on the cyclo-cross season. The team is named after its main sponsors, Bâloise and Trek. The team had various different names in the past amongstr which Spaar-Select and Telenet-Fidea.

Previous leaders of the team are the former Cyclo-Cross World Champions – Erwin Vervecken and Bart Wellens as well as the double Under 23 Cyclo-Cross World Champion, Zdeněk Štybar. Kevin Pauwels also rode for the team. The team manager is Sven Nys and the directeur sportifs include two former Cyclo-Cross World Champions – Danny De Bie and Roland Liboton.

Team roster

Major victories

Men

Cyclo-cross

2000
Cyklokros Tábor, Bart Wellens
2001
Cyclo-cross Wetzikon, Bart Wellens
Cyclo-cross Harnes, Bart Wellens
2002
2003
 UCI Cyclo-cross World Championships, Bart Wellens
Cyclo-cross Wetzikon, Bart Wellens
Cyclo-cross Koppenberg, Bart Wellens
Cyclo-cross Vossem, Bart Wellens
Cyclo-cross Kalmthout, Bart Wellens
Azencross, Bart Wellens
2004
 UCI Cyclo-cross World Championships, Bart Wellens
 Cyclo-cross Championships, Bart Wellens
Grand Prix Nommay, Bart Wellens
Vlaamse Aardbeiencross, Erwin Vervecken
Duinencross Koksijde, Erwin Vervecken
Superprestige Diegem, Erwin Vervecken
2005
Vlaamse Aardbeiencross, Erwin Vervecken
Cyclo-cross Ruddervoorde, Bart Wellens
Cyclo-cross Sint-Michielsgestel, Bart Wellens
Ziklokross Igorre, Bart Wellens
2006
 UCI Cyclo-cross World Championships, Erwin Vervecken
 Cyclo-cross Championships, Jempy Drucker
Niel Jaarmarkt Cyclo-cross, Bart Wellens
Trofeo Mamma & Papà Guerciotti, Bart Wellens
Kersttrofee Hofstade, Erwin Vervecken
2007
 UCI Cyclo-cross World Championships, Erwin Vervecken
 Cyclo-cross Championships, Bart Wellens
 Cyclo-cross Championships, Petr Dlask
Cyclo-cross Kalmthout, Zdeněk Štybar
Niel Jaarmarkt Cyclo-cross, Bart Wellens
2008
 Cyclo-cross Championships, Zdeněk Štybar
 Cyclo-cross Championships, Jempy Drucker
Grand Prix van Hasselt, Bart Wellens
Duinencross Koksijde, Erwin Vervecken
Superprestige Diegem, Zdeněk Štybar
Azencross, Zdeněk Štybar
2009
 Cyclo-cross Championships, Zdeněk Štybar
Grand Prix van Hasselt, Zdeněk Štybar
Bollekescross, Zdeněk Štybar
Duinencross Koksijde, Zdeněk Štybar
Ziklokross Igorre, Zdeněk Štybar
Cyclo-cross Zolder, Kevin Pauwels
2010
 UCI Cyclo-cross World Championships, Zdeněk Štybar
 Cyclo-cross Championships, Zdeněk Štybar
 Cyclo-cross Championships, Robert Gavenda
Overall UCI Cyclo-cross World Cup, Zdeněk Štybar
Overall Cyclo-cross Superprestige, Zdeněk Štybar
Cyclo-cross Roubaix, Zdeněk Štybar
Cyclo-cross Vorselaar, Zdeněk Štybar
Sluitingsprijs Oostmalle, Bart Wellens
Cyclo-cross Namur, Zdeněk Štybar
Cyclo-cross Ruddervoorde, Zdeněk Štybar
Cyclo-cross Aigle, Zdeněk Štybar
Cyklokros Plzeň, Zdeněk Štybar
Grand Prix van Hasselt, Kevin Pauwels
Cyclo-cross Gieten, Tom Meeusen
Cyclo-cross Kalmthout, Tom Meeusen
2011
 UCI Cyclo-cross World Championships, Zdeněk Štybar
 Cyclo-cross Championships, Zdeněk Štybar
 Cyclo-cross Championships, Arnaud Grand
Cyclo-cross Essen, Bart Wellens
Cyclo-cross Pont-Château, Kevin Pauwels
Krawatencross, Kevin Pauwels
2012
Krawatencross, Tom Meeusen
Vlaamse Aardbeiencross, Tom Meeusen
2013
Cyclo-cross Koppenberg, Tom Meeusen
2014
Gran Prix Nommay, Tom Meeusen
Noordzeecross, Tom Meeusen
2021
Cyclo-cross Superprestige Gieten, Toon Aerts
UCI Cyclo-cross World Cup Zonhoven, Toon Aerts
X²O Badkamers Trophy U23 Koppenbergcross, Pim Ronhaar
UCI Cyclo-cross World Cup Tábor, Lars Van der Haar
Cyclo-cross de La Grandville, Thijs Aerts
X²O Badkamers Trophy Urban Cross, Toon Aerts
X²O Badkamers Trophy U23 Urban Cross, Pim Ronhaar

Road cycling

2006
Stage 3 Tour des Pyrénées, Zdeněk Štybar
Stage 6 Volta a Lleida, Zdeněk Štybar
2007
Stage 1 Volta a Lleida, Kevin Pauwels
2008
Stage 1 Volta a Lleida, Bart Wellens
Stage 2 Volta a Lleida, Kevin Pauwels
2009
2010
Stage 1 Flèche du Sud, Kevin Pauwels
Stage 4 Tour de Serbie, Kevin Pauwels
Prologue Tour de Slovaquie, Zdeněk Štybar
2011
Stage 6 Tour de Serbie, Tom Meeusen
2017
Internationale Wielertrofee Jong Maar Moedig, Toon Aerts
2018
Stage 4 Oberösterreichrundfahrt, Quinten Hermans
Stage 4 Tour de Wallonie, Quinten Hermans
2019
Overall Flèche du Sud, Quinten Hermans
Prologue, Stages 1 & 2, Quinten Hermans

Women

Cyclo-cross
2021
Cyclo-cross Superprestige Gieten, Lucinda Brand
USCX Cyclocross Jingle Cross, Shirin van Anrooij
Cyclo-cross Superprestige Jaarmarktcross, Lucinda Brand
UCI Cyclo-cross World Cup Tabor, Lucinda Brand
Cyclo-cross Superprestige Merksplas, Lucinda Brand
X²O Badkamers Trophy Urban Cross, Lucinda Brand
UCI Cyclo-cross World Cup Besançon, Lucinda Brand
Cyclo-cross Superprestige De Schorre Boom, Lucinda Brand
UCI Cyclo-cross World Cup Namur, Lucinda Brand

References

External links
 

UCI Continental Teams (Europe)
Cycling teams based in Belgium
Cycling teams established in 2000
2000 establishments in Belgium